The Oldsmobile Aerotech was a series of experimental high-speed vehicles manufactured between 1987 and 1992 incorporating the latest in performance technology with the intention of breaking  multiple automobile speed records.  The first such car was driven by four-time Indy 500 winner A. J. Foyt to a world closed-course speed record of 257.123 mph (413.788 km/h) on August 27, 1987 at the  test track near Fort Stockton Texas. Prior to this, on August 26, 1987, the car had posted a top speed over a mile of 267.88 mph (431.10 km/h).

Development
At the end of 1984, the development of  Oldsmobile Quad 4 engine was beginning. It was an inline-4 engine incorporating four valves per cylinder and dual overhead camshafts, an innovative technology used on a four-cylinder engine at the time. Oldsmobile advertised the engine to be highly fuel efficient and powerful.

The engineers behind the development of the Quad 4 engine were adamant to showcase the engine's capabilities. Under the leadership of Ted Louckes, head of the Quad 4 engine program, they convinced top management at General Motors to develop a research vehicle which would showcase the engine's true potential. Shortly after in 1985, a group of engineers was formed under the leadership of Louckes in order to develop such a vehicle. The vehicle called the Aerotech was to use a sleek body made from carbon fibre in order to keep the weight and the coefficient of drag low in order to achieve maximum aerodynamics. Supporting the body panels would be a modified version March Engineering's 84C CART chassis, the same chassis that was used in the winning car of the 1985 Indianapolis 500. The task of designing the car was given to Ed Welburn, the then assistant chief designer at the Oldsmobile studio.

The initial design sketches of the car were completed in early 1985. Inspired by famous LeMans winning race cars such as the Porsche 917, they quickly gained the approval from GM's top management. The first mockup of the car was completed shortly after the design's approval. Wind tunnel testing showed that the design was aerodynamically efficient but needed a few enhancements as pointed out by Max Schenkel, an aerodynamicist at General Motors who also served as a staff engineer on the Aerotech project. After many hours of wind tunnel testing at General Motors Technical Center at Warren, Michigan it was decided to alter the design by rounding off the shape of the nose and refine the canopy design. The air intakes were also moved from the sides of the car to the top of the rear fenders. Welburn had originally wanted the car to have faired-in wheel wells but an objection by Goodyear, the tire supplier for the project, prevented him from executing such a concept.

The biggest aerodynamic innovation of the design was the car's underbody, incorporating adjustable panels that changed the amount of airflow that flew through the car's underbody tunnels. This system not only generated great amounts of downforce but also allowed the engineers to adjust the system best suitable for different race tracks.

Welburn's original design incorporated a longer rear end, inspired by the Porsche 917 LH, which contradicted Louckes' plan for setting a closed-course record on the Indianapolis Motor Speedway. A long-tail version would hinder the car's handling despite providing a lower coefficient of drag. A short-tail version coupled with a pedestal rear spoiler was deemed more feasible.

By the end of 1986, the construction of the first car was completed; the car was tested by A. J. Foyt at the General Motors proving grounds at Mesa, Arizona. Foyt is said to have admired the car for its stability at high speeds.

As the car neared development, General Motors's senior management didn't give the car approval for the record attempt at the General Motors Brickyard test track. The development team then chose to test the car at Fort Stockton test center located in Texas.

After the successful runs at the General Motors proving grounds, the development team decided to put Welburn's long-tail design to test as well. Construction of a second car in this specification had begun in late 1985. The second car was almost the same as the first but featured elongated rear bodywork tapering downwards and a different engine, departing from the original 2.3-liter single turbocharged Quad 4 engine built by Batten to a twin turbocharged 2.3-litre Quad 4 engine, built in collaboration with Fueling Engineering.

On August 26, 1987, the development team, in the presence of FIA officials, tested the two completed cars on the Fort Stockton test track. As the team went on to adjust the car's aerodynamics, A. J. Foyt tested the second car (long-tail version).

The next day, Foyt set a new speed record with the long-tail version, averaging  after flying-mile runs in both directions of the track.

Oldsmobile produced three versions of the original Aerotech to prove the capabilities of the company's Quad 4 engine. Two cars were built with shorter rear body work and were called Short Tail versions (ST), and one was built with a longer rear body work and thus called the Long Tail (LT).

Subsequently, between December 7 and 15, 1992, another version of the Aerotech, this time powered by a 4.0-litre Oldsmobile Aurora V8 engine and now fitted with functional lights, broke 47 speed endurance records, including the 10,000- and 25,000-kilometre world speed records. Other national and international speed records ranging from 10 kilometres to 24 hours were accomplished by a team of drivers working 24 hours a day for 8 days. These records were also set at the Fort Stockton test track.

In popular culture
The speed records resulted in a great exposure of Oldsmobile and helped improve its sales. The cars made various appearances at autoshows across North America. A non-functional mock up with a makeshift interior also made its appearance at various circuit races. Ed Welburn, the designer of the car, was also given the opportunity to drive the Aurora Aerotech in December 2010. However, during that time, the car was limited to a mere  to prevent any damages to the internal components.

See also
 Oldsmobile Aerotech II
 Oldsmobile Aerotech III

References

External links
  HowStuffWorks.com - Oldsmobile Aerotech.

Aerotech